Bo Hanson may refer to:

 Bosse Hansson (born 1933), Swedish sports journalist
 Bo Hansson (1943–2010), Swedish musician
 Bo Hanson (Left Behind), a fictional character in the Left Behind novels
 Bo Hanson (rower) (born 1973), Australian Olympic rower
 Bo Hansen (born 1972), Danish footballer